Muangthalang School is a public secondary school in Thalang District, Phuket, Thailand. This school belongs to the Secondary Educational Service Area Office 14, Office of the Basic Education Commission (OBEC), Ministry of Education. The school was founded at Thalang, Phuket, Thailand in 1971 as a district school.

Muangthalang School is located in the historical site of Thalang according to the Burmese attacked. Thao Thep Kasattri and Thao Sri Sunthon, The two heroines, best known for their bravery, sacrifice, and patriotism who repelled a five-week invasion by Burmese in 1785, by dressing up as male soldiers and rallying Siamese troops during the reign of King Rama I—the first king of Chakri dynasty.

Symbols 

 Name : Muangthalang School, MT(abbr.), Muang(colloquially)
 Motto  : No light is as bright as wisdom.
 Seal : Thao Thep Kasattri and Thao Sri Sunthon  : Two Heroines of Thalang.
 Colors : Orange-Blue

Curriculum 
The school follows the national Curriculum of Basic Education, BE 2544 (2001 CE), providing six years of secondary education, Mathayom 1–6.
Many different programs are available for different needs, which aim to develop students' potentialities.
 Programs 
Science - Math Ability Program (For Grades 7–12: Mathayom 1–6)
Science - Math
Arts - Math
Arts - French
Arts - Chinese
Arts - Japanese
Thai - Sociology
Physical Education - English

References 
 www.mt.ac.th Website of Muangthalang School (Thai only)

Schools in Thailand
Buildings and structures in Phuket province